A. edulis may refer to:

 Acioa edulis, the Castanha-de-cutia, a fruit and timber tree species
 Aglaia edulis, a plant species found in Bhutan, Cambodia, China, India, Indonesia and Malaysia
 Allophylus edulis, a plant species endemic to Guyanas, Brazil, Bolivia, Paraguay, Argentina and Uruguay

Synonyms 
 Aranea edulis, a synonym for the Australian spider Nephila edulis

See also
 Edulis (disambiguation)